The Faculty of History is one of the faculties of the Moscow State University. Established at 1934 on the base of the Historical-philological faculty of the university. The dean of the faculty was Sergey Karpov (since 1995 to 2018).

History
The first departments of the history, arts and archaeology of the Moscow State University were established at 1804. At 1835 department of history was separated into the department of Russian history and the department of foreign history. The department of Russian history was led by Mikhail Pogodin, Sergei Solovyov, Vasily Klyuchevsky, the department of foreign history was led by Timofey Granovsky. At 1850 the historical-philological faculty was created.

After the October Revolution the Faculty of history and the Faculty of law were mixed into the Faculty of social sciences. At 1925 it was reorganized into a Faculty of Soviet Law and Ethnology. At the 1931 the Historical-philological faculty was transformed into .

At 1934 the Faculties of history in Moscow State University and in Saint Petersburg University were restored.

Notable faculty
 Timofey Granovsky
 Sergey Karpov
 Oleg Khlevniuk
 Leonid Milov
 Nikita Petrov
 Boris Rybakov
 Arkadiĭ Sidorov
 Sergey Solovyov
 Sergei Tokarev
 Valentin Yanin
 Anna Melyukova

Notable alumni
 Lyudmila Alexeyeva, (1927–2018), Russian human rights activist
 Svetlana Aliluyeva, (1926–2011), the youngest child and the only daughter of Joseph Stalin
 Sergei Bodrov Jr., (1971–2002), Russian actor
 Olga Kabo, (born 1968), Russian actress
 Yuri Knorozov, (1922–1999), Soviet linguist and ethnographer, who is known for his role in the decipherment of the Maya script
 Victor Schnirelmann, (born 1949), Russian historian and ethnologist
 Nikolai Svanidze, (born 1955), Russian TV and radio host
 Savva Yamshchikov, (1938–2009), Russian restorer
 Valentin Yanin (born 1929), leading Russian historian and archaeologist
 Konstantin Zatulin, (born 1958), Russian politician

References

History, Faculty of
Education in Moscow